Pisgah is an unincorporated community in Gilmer County, in the U.S. state of Georgia.

History
A post office called Pisgah was established in 1887, and remained in operation until 1953. The community was named after Mount Pisgah, a place mentioned in the Hebrew Bible.

References

Unincorporated communities in Gilmer County, Georgia